Metarctia collocalia is a moth of the subfamily Arctiinae. It was described by Sergius G. Kiriakoff in 1957. It is found in the Democratic Republic of the Congo, Malawi, Tanzania and Zimbabwe.

Subspecies
Metarctia collocalia collocalia (Malawi, Zimbabwe)
Metarctia collocalia montium Kiriakoff, 1957 (Democratic Republic of the Congo)
Metarctia collocalia kilimaensis (Kiriakoff, 1957) (Tanzania)

References

Metarctia
Moths described in 1957
Lepidoptera of the Democratic Republic of the Congo
Lepidoptera of Malawi
Lepidoptera of Tanzania
Lepidoptera of Zimbabwe
Moths of Sub-Saharan Africa